Syrtis Major Planum is a "dark spot" (an albedo feature) located in the boundary between the northern lowlands and southern highlands of Mars just west of the impact basin Isidis in the Syrtis Major quadrangle. It was discovered, on the basis of data from Mars Global Surveyor, to be a low-relief shield volcano, but was formerly believed to be a plain, and was then known as Syrtis Major Planitia. The dark color comes from the basaltic volcanic rock of the region and the relative lack of dust.

A selected landing site for the Mars 2020 rover mission is Jezero crater (at ) within the region. The northeastern region of Syrtis Major Planum was also considered a potential landing site.

Geography and geology
It is in the Syrtis Major quadrangle. It encompasses a large slope from its western edge at Aeria dropping  to its eastern edge at Isidis Planitia. It includes a high-altitude bulge that rises  at 310° W. Most of Syrtis Major has slopes of less than 1°, a much lower inclination than the slopes of the Tharsis shield volcanoes. It has a 350 km × 150 km north–south elongated central depression containing the calderas Nili Patera and Meroe Patera, which are about 2 km deep. The floors of the calderas are unique among large Martian volcanoes as they are not elevated relative to the terrain surrounding Syrtis Major. This may account for the high degree of magmatic evolution and hydrothermal activity seen in Nili Patera. The floor of Nili Patera is the less cratered, and therefore the younger, of the two. While most of the rock is basaltic, dacite has also been detected in Nili Patera. Satellite gravity field measurements show a positive gravity anomaly centered on the caldera complex, suggesting the presence of a 600 km × 300 km north–south elongated extinct magma chamber below, containing dense minerals (probably mainly pyroxene, with olivine also possible) that precipitated out of magma before eruptions. Crater counts date Syrtis Major to the early Hesperian epoch; it postdates formation of the adjacent Isidis impact basin.

Discovery and name
The name Syrtis Major is derived from the classical Roman name Syrtis maior for the Gulf of Sidra on the coast of Libya (classical Cyrenaica).

Syrtis Major was the first documented surface feature of another planet. It was discovered by Christiaan Huygens, who included it in a drawing of Mars in 1659. He used repeated observations of the feature to estimate the length of day on Mars. The feature was originally known as the Hourglass Sea but has been given different names by different cartographers. In 1850s, Angelo Secchi called the feature Atlantic Canale (later he called it Scorpion and Cook Sea or Cook Canal). In Richard Proctor's 1867 map it is called then Kaiser Sea (after Frederik Kaiser of the Leiden Observatory). Camille Flammarion called it the Mer du Sablier (French for "Hourglass Sea") when he revised Proctor's nomenclature in 1876. The name "Syrtis Major" was chosen by Giovanni Schiaparelli when he created a map based on observations made during Mars' close approach to Earth in 1877.

Seasonal variations

Syrtis Major was the object of much observation due to its seasonal and long-term variations.  This led to theories that it was a shallow sea and later that its variability was due to seasonal vegetation. However, in the 1960s and 1970s, the Mariner and Viking planetary probes led scientists to conclude that the variations were caused by wind blowing dust and sand across the area.  It has many windblown deposits that include light-colored halos or plumose streaks that form downwind of craters.  These streaks are accumulations of dust resulting from disruption of the wind by the elevated rims of the craters ('wind shadows').

Nili Patera Caldera 

Nili Patera is a 50 km diameter caldera at the center of the Syrtis Major Volcanic Complex. It and Meroe Patera located to the south are the primary named calderas within a nested caldera complex developed by multiple eruption and collapse events. In the Northeast quadrant of Nili Patera is a 630 m tall volcanic cone named Nili Tholus, on and around this cone is a light-tone lava flow of chemically evolved lava with multiple occurrences of relict silica sinter deposits created by a formerly active hot spring system.

Moving sand dunes and ripples

Nili Patera was the subject of a 2010 study into moving sand dunes and wind ripples. The study showed that dunes are active and that sand ripples are actively migrating on the surface of Mars. A following study also showed that the sand dunes move at about the same flux (volume per time) as dunes in Antarctica. This was unexpected because of the thin air and the winds which are weaker than Earth winds. It may be due to "saltation" - ballistic movement of sand grains which travel further in the weaker Mars gravity.

The lee fronts of the dunes in this region move on average 0.5 meters per year (though the selection may be biased here as they only measured dunes with clear lee edges to measure) and the ripples move on average 0.1 meters per year.

Gallery

See also

 List of mountains on Mars by height

References

External links
 Syrtis Major map at Google Mars

Albedo features on Mars
Mountains on Mars
Shield volcanoes
Volcanoes of Mars
Mars 2020
Syrtis Major quadrangle